Hope Morgan Ward (born September 18, 1951) is a bishop of the United Methodist Church, elected and consecrated to the episcopacy in 2004. She has served as the Bishop of North Carolina since 2012.

Biography
Hope Morgan Ward was raised on the Morgan family farm in Corapeake, North Carolina. She graduated from Duke University in 1973 with an A.B. degree in English and Religion. She entered seminary at Duke Divinity School and completed the M.Div. degree in 1978.

Bishop Ward married career educator Michael E. Ward in 1977. Mike served as the North Carolina Superintendent of Public Instruction  from 1997 - 2004.  The Wards have two children, Jason and Brooke.

Ordained ministry 
Director of Christian Education and Mission, Fairmont UMC, 1973-1978
Teaching parent, chaplain, Methodist Home for Children, 1977-1979 
Minister of Education, White Plains UMC, 1979-1983 
Pastor, Broadway UMC, 1983-1986 
Pastor, Soapstone UMC, 1986-1997 
Director of Connectional Ministries, 1997-2002
Raleigh District Superintendent, 2002-2004
Bishop of Mississippi Conference 2004-2012
Bishop of North Carolina Conference 2012–present

See also 
 List of bishops of the United Methodist Church

References 
 The Council of Bishops of the United Methodist Church
 InfoServ, the official information service of The United Methodist Church
  , Southeastern Jurisdiction of the United Methodist Church

Notes

1951 births
Living people
United Methodist bishops of the Southeastern Jurisdiction
Spouses of North Carolina politicians
Duke University Trinity College of Arts and Sciences alumni
Duke Divinity School alumni
21st-century Methodist ministers
20th-century Methodist ministers
People from Gates County, North Carolina
20th-century American clergy
21st-century American clergy